New Orleans English is American English native to the city of New Orleans and its metropolitan area. Native English speakers of the region actually speak a number of varieties, including the variety most recently brought in and spreading since the 20th century among white communities of the Southern United States in general (Southern U.S. English); the variety primarily spoken by black residents (African American Vernacular English); the variety spoken by Cajuns in southern Louisiana (Cajun English); the variety traditionally spoken by affluent white residents of the city's Uptown and Garden District; and the variety traditionally spoken by lower middle- and working-class white residents of Eastern New Orleans, particularly the Ninth Ward (sometimes known, since at least the 1980s, as Yat). However, only the last two varieties are unique to New Orleans and are typically those referred to in the academic research as "New Orleans English". These two varieties specific to New Orleans likely developed around the turn of the nineteenth century and most noticeably combine speech features commonly associated with both New York City English and, to a lesser extent, Southern U.S. English. The noticeably New York-like characteristics include the NYC-like short-a split (so that mad and map, for example, do not have the same vowel), non-rhoticity, th-stopping (so that, for example, "those" may sound like "doze"), and the recently disappearing coil–curl merger.

Often, the term "Yat" refers particularly to the New Orleans accents that are "strongest" or most especially reminiscent of a working-class New York City accent, though others use the term as a regional marker, to define the speech heard in certain parts of the city and its inner suburbs. Used in these narrower senses, Yat is simply one of many sub-dialects of New Orleans. The word comes from the common use of the local greeting, "Where y'at?" or "Where are you at (i.e. in life)?", which is a way of asking, "How are you?"

History
A unique New Orleans accent, or "Yat" accent, is considered an identity marker of white metropolitan people who have been raised in the greater New Orleans area. English professor Allan A. Metcalf discusses that "Yats" mostly live near the Irish Channel in blue-collar neighborhoods. The dialect's connotation with the working-class white population therefore encodes the speaker's identities. 

The striking similarity between the New Orleans Yat accent and the accent of the New York metropolitan area has been the subject of much speculation. Plausible origins of the accent are described in A. J. Liebling's book The Earl of Louisiana, in a passage that was used as a foreword to A Confederacy of Dunces, John Kennedy Toole's well-known posthumously published novel about New Orleans:

In the decades following the 1803 Louisiana Purchase, when New Orleans changed from being a French colonial possession to an American city, Irish, German, and eventually Italian (largely Sicilian) immigrants indeed began populating the city. However, rather than believing the New York and New Orleans dialects evolved similarly merely due to a similar mixture of European immigrant populations, modern linguists believe that the dialect histories of New Orleans and New York City actually have a direct relationship: significant commercial and demographic interactions between the two cities. Although exact linguistic theories vary, the broad consensus is that key New York accent features probably diffused to New Orleans by the late 19th century. Large-scale movements (permanent or seasonal) of working-class, lower middle-class, and merchant-class Northeastern Americans of European immigrant families to New Orleans may have brought along their native Northeastern (namely, New York City) accent features. Even during the antebellum era, Northerners made up over a quarter of all free, white, non-immigrant residents of New Orleans. Linguist William Labov specifically argues that Jewish American bankers and cotton merchants strongly affiliated with New York City were the biggest influence on upper-class accents (and presumably, the eventual accents of all classes) in New Orleans. He cites examples of Sephardic and German Jewish connections to influential merchantile firms in 19th-century New Orleans.

Local variance

The Yat accent is the most pronounced version of the New Orleans accent and is perceptually similar to a New York accent. As with all dialects, there is variance in the accent to geographic and social factors like one's specific neighborhood or income level. The type, strength, and lexicon of the accent vary from section to section of the New Orleans metropolitan area. Longtime residents can often tell what area the other residents are from by their accent.

Speakers of this dialect originated in the Ninth Ward, as well as the Irish Channel and Mid-City. Lighter features of the dialect can be heard in some parts of the city, such as Lakeview, the Marigny, the Garden District, and some parts of Gentilly, but mainly in the suburbs. The dialect is present to some degree in all seven parishes that make up the New Orleans metropolitan area, from St. Tammany to Plaquemines. As with many sociolinguistic artifacts in the 21st century, the dialect is usually more distinct among older members of the population. The New Orleans suburban area of Chalmette shows the strongest Yat accent.

Linguistic features

Though there are many New Orleans accents, they all vary strongly in pronunciation. On the subject of the 'Yat' accent, numerous phonological differences occur between words pronounced in the dialect and their standard equivalents, most often in the form a stress-shift toward the front of a word (i.e., 'insurance' as ), or in the form of a change in vowel quality. A southern tendency that shifts vowel sounds known as monophthongization has distinctly separated Yat from other port city dialects.

Some of the most distinct features are:
'heart,' fire' become)
the full rhotacization of a syllable-internal  (i.e. 'toilet,' becomes ). This feature is more typical in men than in women.
'the,' 'there,' 'strength' become ,)
The dough-door merger can be heard.
the split of the historic short-a class into tense  and lax  versions

There are some words with phonemic incidence, yet according to no particular pattern, including 'sink' , 'room' , 'mayonnaise' , 'museum' , 'ask' .

New Orleans is pronounced ,  or with the  still intact. The N'awlins'  of the tourist industry and the common  are not to be heard among natives. Louisiana can be pronounced as the standard  or a slightly reduced  in the 'Yat' dialect.

In popular culture

The distinct New Orleans dialect has been depicted in many ways throughout the city and the U.S.

The main character of the cartoon strip Krazy Kat spoke in a slightly exaggerated phonetically-rendered version of early-20th century Yat; friends of the New Orleans-born cartoonist George Herriman recalled that he spoke with many of the same distinctive pronunciations.

Actual New Orleans accents were seldom heard nationally. New Orleanians who attained national prominence in the media often made an effort to tone down or eliminate the most distinctive local pronunciations. Dan Baum's Nine Lives shares the feelings of Ronald Lewis, a native of the Ninth Ward who is embarrassed by his local dialect when speaking in front of a group of white northerners.  After the displacement of Greater New Orleans area residents because of Hurricane Katrina, the United States was introduced to some of the New Orleans Yat accents by constant news coverage. Steven Seagal's show Lawman exposed some Yat accents and dialects to the nation.

Ronnie Virgets, a New Orleans writer, commentator, and journalist, employs New Orleans dialects and accents in his written and spoken works, including the locally produced public radio program, Crescent City.  WWNO, the local public radio station, broadcasts the program and provides access to past Crescent City programs on its website.

The name of the official mascot for the 1984 Louisiana World Exposition, held in New Orleans, was derived from the truncated pronunciation of "See More of the Fair," which results in the pseudo yat speak "Seymore D. Fair."

A Midwest Cajun restaurant chain based in Indianapolis, Indiana carries the name Yats.

Cellphone company Boost Mobile used the phrase "Where Y'At?" in early advertising campaigns.

Who Dat? is a chant commonly tied to the Yat dialect and used in support of the New Orleans Saints football team. The entire chant is "Who dat? Who dat? Who dat say dey gonna beat dem Saints?" Saints fans are collectively called the "Who Dat Nation."

The Yat dialect is seldom heard when New Orleans is depicted in movies and television shows. Traditionally, characters portrayed from New Orleans are heard using a southern or Cajun accent. An example of this is 1986's The Big Easy, in which Dennis Quaid speaks an exaggerated Cajun/southern derivation. This trend has been challenged, though, in light of post-Katrina New Orleans representation, like HBO's Treme and Werner Herzog's Bad Lieutenant: Port of Call New Orleans, both of which feature actual New Orleans locals either speaking in Yat or one of its variations.

Other local dialects and misconceptions
Historically, the city of New Orleans has been home to people of French, Spanish, and African heritages, which led to the creation of the Louisiana Creole language, before this city came under U.S. rule in the Louisiana Purchase. Over the course of the 19th century, the city transitioned from speaking French to becoming a non-rhotic English-speaking society. Similarly, much of the South has historically spoken non-rhotic English.

A misconception in other parts of the U.S. is that the local dialect of New Orleans is the same as Cajun English (spoken in several other areas of South Louisiana), but the city's cultural and linguistic traditions are distinct from that of the predominantly rural Acadiana, an area spanning across South Louisiana. While there has been an influx of Cajuns into the city since the oil boom of the later 20th century and while there are some similarities due to shared roots, Cajun culture has had relatively little influence upon Creole culture and thus Yat culture. The confusion of Cajun culture with the Creole culture is largely due to the confusion of these French cultures by the tourism and entertainment industries; sometimes this was done deliberately, as "Cajun" was often discovered to be a potentially lucrative marketing term. Speakers with a New Orleans accent are typically proud of their accent as it organically stems from the historical mixing of language and culture. This distinctive accent has been dying out generationally in the city due to white flight of the city, but remains very strong in the suburbs. However, the Yat dialect does survive in the city in several areas, notably Mid-city, Lakeview, parts of Gentilly and Uptown.

Notes

References

External links
 On the Hunt for the New Orleans Yat
 Lexicon of New Orleans Terminology and Speech
 Glossary of Terms Used in New Orleans
 A Yat Encyclopedic Reference

Languages attested from the 19th century
St. Bernard Parish, Louisiana
Culture of New Orleans
American English
City colloquials